

Amphibians
 = probably extirpated

Order Anura

Family Ascaphidae

Family Bufonidae

Family Hylidae

Family Scaphiopodidae

Family Ranidae

Family Pipidae

Order Caudata

Family Ambystomatidae

Family Dicamptodontidae

Family Plethodontidae

Family Rhyacotritonidae

Family Salamandridae

External links

Amphibians
California